Moosach is a  left tributary of the river Isar near Munich in Bavaria, Germany. It could also be described as a tributary of the river Amper, because of the stream Mühlbach that splits away carrying about 30% of the water just before the Moosach joins the Isar. After passing through Freising, the main flow enters the Isar near Oberhummel. The Mühlbach branch continues through Moosburg and enters the Amper close to its confluence with the Isar.

See also
List of rivers of Bavaria

References

Rivers of Bavaria
Rivers of Germany